Vera Margrethe Henriksen (née Roscher Lund; 22 March 1927 – 23 May 2016) was a Norwegian novelist, playwright, and non-fiction writer. She was particularly known for her historical novels and plays set in the Middle Ages.

Biography
Vera Margrethe Roscher Lund was born in Oslo and lived there until 1940, when she moved to Arendal. Her father was military officer, later Colonel Ragnvald Alfred Roscher Lund (1899–1975), the first commander of the Norwegian Military Intelligence Service, head of the Norwegian High Command's office FO II in exile in London during World War II. In 1944, she had to flee Norway during the Occupation of Norway by Nazi Germany.

She continued her secondary education at the Norwegian gymnasium in Uppsala, Sweden, and graduated in 1945. The following year she traveled to the United States where her family lived in New Jersey. She studied architecture at Yale University from 1946 to 1948.  From 1948 to 1949, she studied art history and journalism at Columbia University. She married  shipping executive, Olav Gotfred Henriksen in 1948. In total, she lived in the United States from 1946 to 1963.

Her first novel, Sølvhammeren (The Silver Hammer) was published in 1961. This novel was followed by Jærtegn (Miracle) in 1962, and Helgenkongen (The Saint King) in 1963. The trilogy is about Olaf II of Norway and his time. In the 1970s she wrote a novel series from the period after the Protestant Reformation, Trollsteinen from 1970, followed by Pilegrimsferd, Blåbreen, Staupet and Skjærsild, the last from 1977. Among her historical plays are Asbjørn Selsbane from 1972, and Sverdet, first staged in 1974. She has also written books for children and young adults.

Vera Henriksen has an unusually broad and extensive range of writings behind her. She has written or delivered contributions to nearly fifty books. Central is a series of historical novels, some in several volumes, but she has also written contemporary novels, plays and nonfiction. Inspired by her father she developed an early interest in history, especially Norse saga literature. Several of her books center on the problematic transition from Norse mythology to Christianity.

In addition to her fiction writing, Henriksen has written several non-fiction books. Among these are two volumes of the history of the Royal Norwegian Air Force, covering the period from 1912 until 1945.

She was decorated Knight, First Class of the Royal Norwegian Order of St. Olav in 1997. She was awarded the Norwegian Booksellers' Prize in 1962, and the Mads Wiel Nygaard's Endowment in 1978.

Awards
 1962 - Bokhandlerprisen
 1973 - Sarpsborgprisen
 1978 - Mads Wiel Nygaard's Endowment
 1988 -  Riksmålsforbundets barne- og ungdomsbokpris

Bibliography

Novels 
Sølvhammeren 1961
Jærtegn 1962
Helgekongen  1963
Glassberget  1966
Trollsteinen  1970
Pilgrimsferd  1971
Blåbreen  1973
Staupet 1975
Skjærsild 1977
Dronningsagaen 1979
Kongespeil 1980
Bodvars saga. Odins ravner 1983Bodvars saga. Spydet  1984Hellig Olav  1985Runekorset 1986Rekviem for et lite dampskip  1988Bodvars saga. Ravn og due 1989Silhuetter mot hvitt lys 1990Stavkjerringa 1997Klangen av en lutt  2001Ildens sang  2002Jarlefeiden 2003

PlaysAsbjørn Selsbane 1972 (play)Sverdet 1974 (play)Riksseglet'' 1978 (play)

Non-fiction

References

External links
Dagbladet profile
Aschehoug profile

1927 births
2016 deaths
XU
Norwegian historical novelists
Norwegian expatriates in the United States
Norwegian dramatists and playwrights
Norwegian non-fiction writers
Norwegian women non-fiction writers 
Norwegian women novelists
Norwegian women dramatists and playwrights
Women historical novelists
Writers from Oslo
Columbia University alumni
Yale University alumni